is a passenger railway station located in the city of Ōtsu, Shiga Prefecture, Japan, operated by the West Japan Railway Company (JR West).

Lines

Station layout
The station consists of one elevated island platforms with the station building underneath. The station is staffed.

Platforms

Adjacent Stations

History
The station became part of the West Japan Railway Company on 1 April 1987 due to the privatization and dissolution of the JNR. The station's name was changed to its current name on 4 September 1994.

Station numbering was introduced in March 2018 with Hieizan Sakamoto being assigned station number JR-B27.

Passenger statistics
In fiscal 2019, the station was used by an average of 5,630 passengers daily (boarding passengers only).

Surrounding area
 Saikyoji Temple
 Otsu City Hall Sakamoto Branch
Otsu City Hiyoshi Junior High School
Otsu City Sakamoto Elementary School

See also
List of railway stations in Japan

References

External links

JR West official home page

Railway stations in Japan opened in 1974
Kosei Line
Railway stations in Shiga Prefecture
Railway stations in Ōtsu